Frozen Assets is a 1992 American comedy film directed by George T. Miller. It stars Shelley Long and Corbin Bernsen.

Plot
Los Angeles bank executive Zach Shepard takes a new job at a sperm bank in Oregon. After some initial confusion, Zach and the sperm bank's doctor, Grace Murdock, deal with a shortage of donations by holding a contest with a $100,000 prize. Men abstain from sex to save themselves for donations while a local brothel protests the sperm bank for having ruined its business.

Zach is assisted by Newton, an escaped mental patient who lives with his mother.

Cast
Shelley Long as Dr. Grace Murdock
Corbin Bernsen as Zach Shepard
Larry Miller as Newton Patterson
Dody Goodman as Mrs. Patterson
Gerrit Graham as Lewis Crandall
Matt Clark as J.F. Hughes

Filming
Filming took place in Portland, Oregon and at the Columbia River Gorge.

Reception
The film bombed at the box office, only earning $376,008 in the United States, and received negative reviews. It was lambasted by famed Chicago film critics Gene Siskel and Roger Ebert. In his review for the Chicago Sun-Times, Ebert awarded the film a rare zero-stars rating, writing: "I felt like I was an eyewitness to a disaster. If I had been an actor in the film, I would have wondered why all the characters in this movie seem dumber than the average roadkill. What puzzles me is this film's tone. It's essentially a children's film with a dirty mind. This is a movie to watch in appalled silence. To call it the year's worst would be a kindness." Frozen Assets holds a 0% rating on Rotten Tomatoes based on nine reviews.

References

External links

1992 films
Films directed by George T. Miller
Films scored by Michael Tavera
Films shot in Oregon
Films shot in Portland, Oregon
1990s English-language films